Darreh Bonyab (also Romanized as Darreh Bonyāb and Darreh Bonīāb; also known as Darreh-ye Banī) is a village in Seydun-e Jonubi Rural District, Seydun District, Bagh-e Malek County, Khuzestan Province, Iran. At the 2006 census, its population was 1,075, in 199 families.

References 

Populated places in Bagh-e Malek County